Dix is a village in Jefferson County, Illinois, United States. The population was 461 at the 2010 census. It is part of the Mount Vernon Micropolitan Statistical Area.

Geography
Dix is located in northern Jefferson County at  (38.440676, -88.942463). Illinois Route 37 is the village's Main Street, leading south  to Mount Vernon, the county seat, and north  to Salem. Interstate 57 passes through the western side of the village, with access from Exit 103. I-57 leads south  to Interstate 64 at Mount Vernon and north  to Interstate 70 at Effingham.

Dix is located on high ground that marks the boundary between the Big Muddy River and its tributary, Casey Creek.

Today Dix is an exit on Interstate 57, a major north/south roadway. When it was founded, however, it was on the Goshen Road, which was the main east/west road in Illinois, running from Old Shawneetown on the Ohio River to near East St. Louis on the Mississippi.

History
Among the first settlers around Dix were two brothers named Andrews (Arba and Nelson?), who came from Rome, New York, around 1830. One of them established a post office called "Jordan's Prairie", the name already given to the grassland to the south. Later he platted out a village, which he called "Rome", after his home town in New York. The post office was moved into the village in 1852, and the name changed.

Hiram Milburn of Kell, Illinois, moved to Rome between 1853 and 1855. Milburn built a storehouse in 1853 and a hotel in 1854. It is said that during the construction of the hotel, a wind blew the structure down into a pile, while two men were on the joists, but nobody was hurt. In 1855 Milburn purchased Leuty's Mill and moved it to Rome.

Although Rome Township still exists, the name of the post office was changed to "Dix" in 1865. There was and still is another Rome, Illinois, and the Postal Service insisted that the name of this village be changed. The community incorporated as the village of Rome in 1873. The name of the village was not legally changed to Dix until the 1960s.

There are several stories as to the origin of the name "Dix". One is that the town was renamed in honor of General John Adams Dix. At the outbreak of the Civil War, General Dix sent a telegram to his agents in New Orleans stating: "If any man pulls down the American flag, shoot him on the spot." Although the telegram was intercepted by Confederate agents and never reached its intended recipient, the text reached the press, and General Dix became one of the first heroes in the North.

Dix is served by the Norfolk Southern Railway. This was built around 1890. The rail line comes from the St. Louis area and turns southeast at Dix. It follows the west side of Casey Creek down to Mt. Vernon.

Demographics

As of the census of 2000, there were 494 people, 274 households, and 116 families residing in the village. The racial makeup of the village was 98.38% White, 0.20% African American, 0.81% Asian, 0.20% from other races, and 0.40% from two or more races. Hispanic or Latino of any race were 0.40% of the population.

There were 274 households, out of which 16.8% had children under the age of 18 living with them, 34.3% were married couples living together, 6.2% had a female householder with no husband present, and 57.3% were non-families. 54.7% of all households were made up of individuals, and 36.1% had someone living alone who was 65 years of age or older.  The average household size was 1.80 and the average family size was 2.73.

In the village, the population was spread out, with 18.4% under the age of 18, 4.9% from 18 to 24, 20.4% from 25 to 44, 24.1% from 45 to 64, and 32.2% who were 65 years of age or older.  The median age was 50 years. For every 100 females, there were 77.7 males.  For every 100 females age 18 and over, there were 69.3 males.

The median income for a household in the village was $12,222, and the median income for a family was $37,321. Males had a median income of $28,000 versus $19,306 for females. The per capita income for the village was $12,463.  About 10.6% of families and 22.0% of the population were below the poverty line, including 9.7% of those under age 18 and 29.5% of those age 65 or over.

Notable people 

 George Corbett, running back for Chicago Bears 1932-38
 Chuck Riley, Oregon State Senator, Senate District 15
 Keith Stroup, activist, founder of NORML

References

External links
Founding of Dix

Villages in Jefferson County, Illinois
Villages in Illinois
Mount Vernon, Illinois micropolitan area
Populated places established in 1869
1869 establishments in Illinois